Graham County (locally ) is a county located in the U.S. state of North Carolina. As of the 2020 census, the population was 8,030, making it the third-least populous county in North Carolina. Its county seat is Robbinsville.

History
The county was formed January 30, 1872, from the northeastern part of Cherokee County.  It was named for William A. Graham, United States Senator from North Carolina (1840–1843) and Governor of North Carolina (1845–1849).

Geography

Two-thirds of the county is the Nantahala National Forest. The soil of the valleys is fertile.

Fontana Lake, an impoundment of the Little Tennessee River, forms most of the northern border of the county, with the Great Smoky Mountains National Park on the other side of the lake. Fontana Lake is formed by Fontana Dam, the tallest dam in the eastern U.S. The remainder of the northern boundary of Graham County is almost completely formed by another impoundment of the Little Tennessee River, downstream from Fontana Dam, created by Cheoah Dam. Fontana Dam and Cheoah Dam are both operated by the Tennessee Valley Authority.

The Appalachian Trail winds through Graham County. Part of the trail is located on top of Fontana Dam. The Cheoah River is noted for its Class IV and Class V whitewater rapids. The river is used for whitewater rafting about 17 days per year, based on a water-release schedule from Santeetlah Dam. Seventy-five percent of Lake Santeetlah shoreline borders national forest.

Joyce Kilmer Memorial Forest,  a rare example of an old growth cove hardwood forest, is located in northwestern Graham County. Joyce Kilmer Memorial Forest is part of the Joyce Kilmer-Slickrock Wilderness area.

The eastern terminus of the Cherohala Skyway is located in northwestern Graham County. The  Cherohala Skyway connects Graham County with Tellico Plains, Tennessee.

The Cherokee name for the area, Nantahala, is translated as "land of the noon-day sun" because 90% of the land is slopes of 30 degrees or greater, suggesting that in the valleys one sees the sun only in the middle of the day.

Indian reservation
Parts of the Qualla Boundary, also known as the Eastern Cherokee Indian Reservation, are located in Graham County. These sections of the Qualla Boundary are non-contiguous from the primary part of the Qualla Boundary located in Swain, Jackson, Cherokee and Haywood counties. The Cherokees who live in Graham County form the Snowbird Cherokee community.

National protected area
 Cherohala Skyway
 Great Smoky Mountains National Park (part)
 Joyce Kilmer-Slickrock Wilderness (part)
 Nantahala National Forest (part)

Major water bodies 
 Deep Creek
 Fontana Lake
 Hooper Mill Creek
 Little Santeetlah Creek
 Little Tennessee River
 Santeetlah Creek
 Santeetlah Lake
 Snowbird Creek
 Tulula Creek

Adjacent counties
 Blount County, Tennessee - north
 Swain County - northeast
 Macon County - southeast
 Cherokee County - south
 Monroe County, Tennessee - west

Major highways

Demographics

2020 census

As of the 2020 United States census, there were 8,030 people, 3,393 households, and 2,178 families residing in the county.

2000 census
As of the census of 2000, there were 7,993 people, 3,354 households, and 2,411 families residing in the county.  The population density was 27 people per square mile (11/km2).  There were 5,084 housing units at an average density of 17 per square mile (7/km2).  The racial makeup of the county was 91.91% White, 0.19% Black or African American, 6.84% Native American, 0.16% Asian, 0.01% Pacific Islander, 0.13% from other races, and 0.76% from two or more races.  0.75% of the population were Hispanic or Latino of any race. 27.6% were of American, 15.1% Irish, 12.7% English, 10.6% German and 5.1% Scots-Irish ancestry according to Census 2000. 97.7% spoke English and 1.3% Cherokee as their first language.

There were 3,354 households, out of which 27.10% had children under the age of 18 living with them, 60.80% were married couples living together, 8.40% had a female householder with no husband present, and 28.10% were non-families. 26.00% of all households were made up of individuals, and 12.30% had someone living alone who was 65 years of age or older.  The average household size was 2.35 and the average family size was 2.82.

In the county, the population was spread out, with 22.00% under the age of 18, 7.30% from 18 to 24, 25.20% from 25 to 44, 27.50% from 45 to 64, and 18.00% who were 65 years of age or older.  The median age was 42 years. For every 100 females there were 95.30 males.  For every 100 females age 18 and over, there were 92.60 males.

The median income for a household in the county was $26,645, and the median income for a family was $32,750. Males had a median income of $24,207 versus $18,668 for females. The per capita income for the county was $14,237.  About 14.40% of families and 19.50% of the population were below the poverty line, including 24.30% of those under age 18 and 20.40% of those age 65 or over.

Government, public safety, and politics

Government
Graham County is governed by an elected five member Board of Commissioners. The county is a member of the regional Southwestern Commission council of governments. In 2021, the county began allowing acholic beverage to be purchased within the county. It was the last dry county (in which alcohol sales are generally forbidden with only a few exceptions) in North Carolina.

Public safety
The Graham County Sheriff's Office protects the court and all county owned facilities, operates the jail, and provides patrol and detective services. Graham County Emergency Medical Services provide full-time paramedic level care to all of Graham County, and to a small portion of northwest Swain County. As there are no hospitals in Graham County, all patients are transported out of county for emergency care.

Communities

Towns
 Fontana Dam
 Lake Santeetlah
 Robbinsville (county seat and largest town)

Townships
 Cheoah
 Stecoah
 Yellow Creek

Other communities
Many smaller communities in Graham County are named for bodies of water, notable landscape features, or early settlers. Other unincorporated communities in Graham County include:

 Atoah
 Bear Creek Junction
 Cheoah
 Dentons
 Dry Creek
 Hidetown
 Jenkins Meadow
 Junction
 McGuires
 Meadow Branch
 Milltown
 Rymers Ferry
 Sawyers Creek
 Stecoah
 Sweetgum
 Tapoco (named for the Tallassee Power Company)
 Tulula (just south of Robbinsville; may have been named for a mythological Cherokee Indian)
 Tuskeegee
 Yellow Creek

In popular culture
 Portions of the movie Nell (1994), starring Jodie Foster, were filmed near Robbinsville.
 Portions of the movie The Fugitive (1993), starring Harrison Ford, were filmed at Cheoah Dam.
 The historic 1927 silent film Stark Love was filmed in Graham County and featured local residents as actors.
 Some scenes from In Dreams (1999), starring Annette Bening and Robert Downey Jr.,were filmed in the area around Fontana Village.

See also
 List of counties in North Carolina
 National Register of Historic Places listings in Graham County, North Carolina
 USS Graham County (LST-1176)
 National Park Service
 List of national forests of the United States

References

External links

 
 

 
Counties of Appalachia
1872 establishments in North Carolina
Populated places established in 1872